In the run up to the 2016 Slovak parliamentary election, various organisations carry out opinion polling to gauge voting intention in Slovakia. Results of such polls are displayed in this article.

The date range for these opinion polls are from the previous parliamentary election, held on 5 March 2016, to the present day.

Party vote

Notes

References

Opinion polling in Slovakia
Slovakia